was the highest ranking  priestess of the Ryukyuan religion during the period of the Ryukyu Kingdom.

After Ryukyu's annexation by Japan in 1879, this position was formally abolished, but the last  continued her role until her death in 1944.

List of

See also
Saiō
Saiin (priestess)
Noro (priestess)
Ryukyuan religion
Sefa-utaki
Omoro Sōshi

References

15th-century establishments in Asia
1879 disestablishments in Japan
1944 disestablishments in Japan
Religion in the Ryukyu Islands
Ryukyuan culture
Shamanism in Japan
Religious titles
Priestesses